The Capture of the galleon San Joaquin or the Battle of Cartagena was a naval engagement that took place off the coast near Cartagena (present day Colombia). It involved five British ships of the line against the Spanish galleon  San Joaquin  and a smaller ship. After an action lasting barely an hour the Spanish ship surrendered. The galleon had fought in the previous encounter during Wager's Action nearly three years earlier but had just barely escaped capture.

Background
In late May 1711, the warships under the command of Jean du Casse arrived, and so on 3 August 1711 they sailed from Cartagena which now composed of the Treasure Fleet which was to return to Spain. The units of escort  composed of the following: San Joaquin of 64 guns under Admiral Miguel Agustin Villanueva, Saint-Michel of 70 guns under Jean du Casse, Hercule of 60 guns under Captain Proglie and the frigate Griffon of 44 guns under Captain Turroble.

Capture
Du Casse had left the frigate Gallarde in Cartagena for its defense and so on the day of leaving, the fleet were soon spotted by Littleton's fleet but a storm prevented any action, and both fleets dispersed. Most of the fleet, including du Casse, returned to Cartagena without giving any advice to Admiral Villanueva. On 7 August the galleon San Joaquin was separated along with a smaller vessel and a squadron was sighted. Villaneuva thought the vessels were that of du Casse, but it was the English squadron of Littleton.

When Villanueva realized his error, it was too late to flee, and he decided to take on Littleton's squadron. The ensuing engagement lasted less than 20 minutes. San Joaquin was dismasted and suffered many casualties. Villaneuva, surrounded by the overwhelming British squadron, was mortally wounded when hit by a musket shot and soon struck his flag. Littleton, went on board from Salisbury and took the surrender. Vernon in Jersey captured the smaller vessel, which was attempting to escape.

Aftermath
The galleon's prize money was shared amongst the captains and the British sailed back to Port Royal. By order of King Philip V, the treasure was transferred to the French ships. Three days after the battle, du Casse, knowing that San Joaquin was lost, left Cartagena and sent his forces first towards Martinique, then to Pensacola, and finally to Spain where they reached safely.

Notes

References
 Action off Cartagena Royal Geographical Society of South Australia
 Marley, David. Wars of the Americas: A Chronology of Armed Conflict in the Western Hemisphere 
 Phillips, Carla Rahn El Tesoro de San Jose — Muerte en el mar durante la Guerra Sucesión Española The Treasure of the San José: Death at Sea in the War of the Spanish Succession Johns Hopkins University Press (2007) 

Conflicts in 1711
Naval battles of the War of the Spanish Succession
Naval battles involving Great Britain
Naval battles involving Spain